The following is a list of notable deaths in September 2017.

Entries for each day are listed alphabetically by surname. A typical entry lists information in the following sequence:
 Name, age, country of citizenship at birth, subsequent country of citizenship (if applicable), what subject was noted for, cause of death (if known), and reference.

September 2017

1
S. Anitha, 17, Indian student, suicide by hanging.
Armando Aste, 91, Italian alpinist.
Shelley Berman, 92, American comedian and actor (Curb Your Enthusiasm, Meet the Fockers, You Don't Mess with the Zohan), Alzheimer's disease.
Vladimír Brabec, 83, Czech actor and voice actor (Thirty Cases of Major Zeman, Desire, Návštěvníci).
Jackie Burkett, 80, American football player (Baltimore Colts), leukemia.
Jérôme Choquette, 89, Canadian lawyer and politician, MNA (1966–1976), pneumonia.
Verner Dalskov, 85, Danish politician, mayor of Odense (1973–1992).
Ralph Dellor, 69, British cricketer and broadcaster, sepsis.
Isaac Fulwood, 77, American police officer, District of Columbia police chief (1989–1992).
Bud George, 89, American politician, member of the Pennsylvania House of Representatives (1975–2013).
Charles Gordon-Lennox, 10th Duke of Richmond, 87, British peer.
Tony Hakaoro, 53, Cook Islands broadcaster and radio talk show host (Radio Cook Islands), stroke.
Hedley Jones, 99, Jamaican musician, audio engineer and inventor.
Alex Karczmar, 100, American neuroscientist.
Elizabeth Kemp, 65, American actress (Love of Life, Challenger, He Knows You're Alone), cancer.
Matthew Labine, 58, American soap opera writer (General Hospital). 
Peadar Lamb, 87, Irish actor (Jakers! The Adventures of Piggley Winks, Mystic Knights of Tir Na Nog, Father Ted).
Paul Moreno, 86, American politician, member of the Texas House of Representatives (1967–2008).
Cormac Murphy-O'Connor, 85, English Roman Catholic cardinal, Archbishop of Arundel and Brighton (1977–2000) and Westminster (2000–2009).
Paul Schaal, 74, American baseball player (Los Angeles Angels, Kansas City Royals), cancer.
Rick Shorter, 83, American folk singer, record producer and author, stroke.
Mick Softley, 77, British singer, songwriter and guitarist.
Štefan Vrablec, 92, Slovak Roman Catholic prelate, Auxiliary Bishop of Bratislava (1998–2004).
Gin D. Wong, 94, Chinese-born American architect.

2
*Shirish Atre-Pai, 87, Indian poet.
Marge Calhoun, 91, American surfer.
Viktor Cherepkov, 75, Russian politician, mayor of Vladivostok (1993–1994, 1996–1998), cancer.
Eric Conn, 94, American biochemist.
Halim El-Dabh, 96, Egyptian-born American composer and ethnomusicologist.
Sybil Flory, 97, Burmese-born British teacher. 
Murray Lerner, 90, American documentarian and producer, Oscar winner (1981), kidney failure.
María Cristina Orive, 86, Guatemalan photojournalist.
Hugo Obwegeser, 96, Austrian oral and plastic surgeon, father of modern orthognathic surgery.
Alberto Pérez Pérez, 80, Uruguayan law scholar, judge of the Inter-American Court of Human Rights. 
Ian Powe, 84, British naval officer. 
Sharad Rao, 60, Indian cricketer.
Michael Simanowitz, 46, American politician, member of the New York State Assembly (since 2011).
Lucky Varela, 82, American politician, member of the New Mexico House of Representatives (1987–2016).
Drew Wahlroos, 37, American football player (St. Louis Rams), suicide by gunshot.
 Xiang Shouzhi, 99, Chinese general, commander of the Nanjing Military Region (1982–1990) and the Second Artillery Corps (1975–1977).

3
Tom Amundsen, 74, Norwegian Olympic rower (1972, 1976).
John Ashbery, 90, American poet (Self-portrait in a Convex Mirror) and art critic, Pulitzer Prize winner (1976).
Walter Becker, 67, American Hall of Fame musician (Steely Dan), songwriter and producer, Grammy winner (2001), esophageal cancer.
William Clauson, 87, Swedish-American singer.
Joan Colom, 96, Spanish photographer.
John Byrne Cooke, 76, American author and musician, throat cancer.
Luis Duarte, 76, Peruvian Olympic basketball player (1964).
Roberto Hernandez Jr., 79, Mexican journalist and sportscaster.
Jesús González, 58, Spanish Olympic rower.
Dave Hlubek, 66, American guitarist and songwriter (Molly Hatchet), heart attack.
Victor Krasin, 88, Ukrainian-born Russian human rights activist, economist and Soviet dissident.
Hans Nylund, 78, Norwegian footballer 
Piet Ouderland, 84, Dutch footballer (Ajax, national team) and basketball player (national team).
Sugar Ramos, 75, Cuban-Mexican Hall of Fame boxer, WBA/WBC featherweight champion (1963–1964), cancer.
Larrington Walker, 70, Jamaican-born British actor (Taboo).
John P. White, 80, American politician, U.S. Deputy Secretary of Defense (1995–1997), Parkinson's disease.
Peter Zobel, 81, Danish Olympic equestrian (1960).

4
Sultan Ahmed, 64, Indian politician, MP for Entally (since 2009), heart attack.
Badih Chaaban, 57, South African politician, Cape Town city councilor (2006–2015), cancer.
Don Cockburn, 87, Irish journalist, presenter and newsreader (RTÉ).
David Consunji, 95, Filipino engineer and industrialist.
Mountaga Diallo, 74–75, Senegalese diplomat and army officer, Force Commander of MONUSCO (2000–2004), Ambassador to Russia (since 2005).
Bob Kehoe, 89, American soccer player.
Jomde Kena, 49, Indian politician.
John Wilson Lewis, 86, American political scientist.
Earl Lindo, 64, Jamaican reggae musician (Bob Marley and the Wailers).
Lev Lipatov, 77, Russian nuclear and particle physicist.
Abdullah Maute, Filipino Islamist militant (Maute group), airstrike. (death announced on this date)
Les McDonald, 84, British-Canadian triathlon competitor and administrator.
Harry Meshel, 93, American politician, member of the Ohio Senate (1970–1993).
Gastone Moschin, 88, Italian actor (The Godfather Part II, Caliber 9, My Friends), cardiomyopathy.
José Trinidad Sepúlveda Ruiz-Velasco, 96, Mexican Roman Catholic prelate, Bishop of Tuxtla (1965–1988) and San Juan de los Lagos (1988–1999), respiratory complications.

5
Eloísa Álvarez, 61, Spanish politician, Mayor of Soria (1999–2003), Deputy (2004–2011) and Senator for Soria (2011–2015).
Nicolaas Bloembergen, 97, Dutch-American physicist, Nobel Prize laureate (1981).
Holger Czukay, 79, German musician (Can).
Cedric Hassall, 97, New Zealand chemist.
Robert Jenson, 87, American theologian.
Mike Lair, 71, American politician, member of the Missouri House of Representatives (2009–2016), heart disease.
Gauri Lankesh, 55, Indian journalist and political activist, shot.
Ma Kwang-soo, 66, South Korean author.
Gina Mason, 57, American politician, member of the Maine House of Representatives (since 2017).
Arno Rink, 76, German painter.
Hansford Rowe, 93, American actor (Three Days of the Condor, Dante's Peak, The Bonfire of the Vanities), traffic collision.
Bo Södersten, 86, Swedish professor and politician, MP (1979–1988).
Sir Terence Streeton, 87, British diplomat, High Commissioner to Bangladesh (1983–1989).
Tom Wright, 93, American baseball player (Chicago White Sox, Boston Red Sox).

6
Derek Bourgeois, 75, English composer, cancer.
Sir Robert Bruce-Gardner, 74, British art conservator.
Carlo Caffarra, 79, Italian Roman Catholic cardinal, Archbishop of Ferrara–Comacchio (1995–2003) and Bologna (2003–2015).
Raúl Castañeda, 34, Mexican Olympic boxer (2004), shot.
Daniel Federman, 89, American medical researcher.
Walter Guralnick, 100, American dentist.
Rosa Judge, 97, Maltese musician.
Peter Luck, 73, Australian journalist and television presenter (This Day Tonight), Parkinson's disease.
Nicolae Lupescu, 76, Romanian football player (Rapid București, Admira Wacker Wien, national team) and manager.
Şerif Mardin, 90, Turkish sociologist.
Jim McDaniels, 69, American basketball player (Seattle SuperSonics, Los Angeles Lakers, Buffalo Braves), complications from diabetes.
Eleanore Mikus, 90, American artist.
Kate Millett, 82, American feminist writer (Sexual Politics), cardiac arrest.
Mike Neville, 80, British television presenter (BBC North East and Cumbria, ITV Tyne Tees), cancer.
Noel Picard, 78, Canadian ice hockey player (Montreal Canadiens, St. Louis Blues, Atlanta Flames).
Solomon Efimovich Shulman, 81, Belarusian writer and film director.
Dimitris Varos, 68, Greek journalist and poet.
Hugo Wathne, 84, Norwegian sculptor.
Roy Williams, 80, American football player (San Francisco 49ers).
Lotfi A. Zadeh, 96, Azerbaijani-born American mathematician, innovator of fuzzy mathematics.

7
Türkân Akyol, 88, Turkish politician, physician and academic, Minister of Health and Social Security (1971) and rector of University of Ankara (1980–1982).
Jeremiah Goodman, 94, American illustrator.
Terence Harvey, 72, British actor (Hollyoaks, From Hell, The Phantom of the Opera).
Mike Hicks, 80, British politician, General Secretary of the Communist Party (1988–1998).
Tsunenori Kawai, 80, Japanese politician, member of the House of Councillors (since 2004).
Kim Ki-duk, 82, South Korean film director (Five Marines) and professor (Seoul Institute of the Arts), lung cancer.
Mark P. Mahon, 87, American politician, member of the Minnesota House of Representatives (1993–1998).
Gene Michael, 79, American baseball player, manager and executive (New York Yankees), World Series winner (1978), heart attack.
Charles Owens, 85, American golfer.
Jeanne Robert, 103, French WWII resistance member.
Roger Gordon Strand, 83, American federal judge, U.S. District Court for the District of Arizona (1985–2000).
Tomás Villanueva, 64, Spanish politician, Vice President of Castile and León region (2001–2003), heart attack.
Duncan Watt, 74, Zambian-born Singaporean broadcaster and author.

8
Ann Bagnall, 90, British cookbook publisher.
Lawrence Bartell, 84, American physical chemist.
Pierre Bergé, 86, French businessman, co-founder of Yves Saint Laurent, myopathy.
Cory Cadden, 48, Canadian ice hockey player (Knoxville Cherokees).
Parzival Copes, 93, Canadian economist.
Isabelle Daniels, 80, American sprinter, Olympic bronze medalist (1956).
A. Joseph DeNucci, 78, American boxer and politician, Massachusetts State Auditor (1987–2011), complications from Alzheimer's disease.
Douglas Fitzgerald Dowd, 97, American political economist and activist.
Kevin Dynon, 92, Australian football player (North Melbourne).
Troy Gentry, 50, American country singer (Montgomery Gentry), helicopter crash.
Blake Heron, 35, American actor (Shiloh, We Were Soldiers, Nick Freno: Licensed Teacher), accidental fentanyl overdose.
Connie Johnson, 40, Australian cancer research fundraiser, breast cancer.
Harry M. Kuitert, 92, Dutch theologian (Reformed Churches in the Netherlands).
Catherine Hardy Lavender, 87, American sprinter, Olympic gold medalist (1952).
Daniel McNeill, 70, American politician, member of the Pennsylvania House of Representatives (since 2013).
Toshihiko Nakajima, 55, Japanese voice actor (Cowboy Bebop, Inuyasha, Mobile Suit Gundam).
Jerry Pournelle, 84, American science fiction author (CoDominium) and journalist (Byte).
Karl Ravens, 90, German politician, Federal Minister of Regional Planning, Construction and Urban Development (1974–1978).
Humberto Rosa, 85, Argentine-Italian football player.
Ljubiša Samardžić, 80, Serbian actor (Vruć vetar) and director.
José Antonio Souto, 78, Spanish jurist, academic and politician, Mayor of Santiago de Compostela (1979–1981).
R. N. Sudarshan, 78, Indian actor (Super), kidney disease.
Don Williams, 78, American Hall of Fame country music singer ("Tulsa Time", "I Believe in You", "You're My Best Friend") and songwriter, emphysema.

9
Frank Aarebrot, 70, Norwegian political scientist, complications following a heart attack.
Gretta Chambers, 90, Canadian journalist (Montreal Gazette) and Chancellor of McGill University (1991–1999).
Velasio de Paolis, 81, Italian Roman Catholic cardinal, President of the Prefecture for the Economic Affairs of the Holy See (2008–2011), cancer.
Jim Donohue, 79, American baseball player (Los Angeles Angels).
Michael Friedman, 41, American composer and lyricist (Bloody Bloody Andrew Jackson), complications from AIDS.
Sir Pat Goodman, 88, New Zealand businessman (Goodman Fielder).
Mike Hodge, 70, American actor (Law & Order, All My Children, Striking Distance) and union executive (SAG-AFTRA).
Oscar E. Huber, 100, American politician, member of the South Dakota House of Representatives (1961–1972).
Geoffrey Maynard, 95, British economist.
Otto Meitinger, 90, German architect and preservationist, president of the Technical University of Munich (1987–1995).
Harold Nutter, 93, Canadian Anglican prelate, Metropolitan of Canada (1980–1989).
Pierre Pilote, 85, Canadian ice hockey player (Chicago Blackhawks).
Doug Sewell, 87, English golfer.
*Wang Hairong, 78, Chinese politician.

10
Hans Alfredson, 86, Swedish actor (The Apple War), film director (The Simple-Minded Murderer), writer and comedian (Hasse & Tage).
Xavier Atencio, 98, American animator, lyricist and Imagineer (Pirates of the Caribbean, Haunted Mansion).
Stephen Begley, 42, Scottish rugby union player (Glasgow Warriors).
Luigi Maria Burruano, 68, Italian actor (One Hundred Steps, The Return of Cagliostro, Baarìa), cancer.
Mel Didier, 90, American baseball scout (Toronto Blue Jays, Montreal Expos) and coach (Southwestern Louisiana Ragin' Cajuns).
Nancy Dupree, 89, American historian (modern Afghanistan).
*E Thi, 47, Burmese fortune teller.
Sir David Ford, 82, British government official, Chief Secretary of Hong Kong (1986–1993).
Kenneth I. Gross, 78, American mathematician.
Harry Landers, 96, American actor (Ben Casey).
René Laurentin, 99, French theologian.
Leila Mardanshina, 90, Russian oil and gas operator.
Kate Murtagh, 96, American actress (Breakfast at Tiffany's, Doctor Detroit, The Twilight Zone).
James Morwood, 73, English classical scholar.
Don Ohlmeyer, 72, American entertainment executive (NBC, NBC Sports, ABC Sports), cancer.
Jean Pruitt, 77, American charity worker.
Konstantins Pupurs, 53, Latvian political scientist.
B. V. Radha, 69, Indian actress (Thazhampoo), heart attack.
Rommel Sandoval, 38, Filipino Army officer, shot during Battle in Marawi.
Grigoris Varfis, 90, Greek politician, MEP (1984–1985) and Commissioner for Regional Policy (1985–1989).
Gerald Willet, 82, American politician, member of the Minnesota Senate (1971–1988).
Len Wein, 69, American comic book writer and editor (X-Men, Swamp Thing, Watchmen), co-creator of Wolverine.

11
*Abdul Halim of Kedah, 89, Malaysian sultan, Yang di-Pertuan Agong (1970–1975, 2011–2016), Sultan of Kedah (since 1958).
Jan Brittin, 58, English cricketer, cancer.
Alfonso Caycedo, 84, Colombian medical hypnotist.
Dan Currie, 82, American football player (Green Bay Packers).
J. P. Donleavy, 91, Irish-American novelist and playwright (The Ginger Man, A Fairy Tale of New York).
Alfred Gadenne, 71, Belgian politician, mayor of Mouscron (since 2006), slit throat.
Sir Peter Hall, 86, British theatre, opera and film director, director of the National Theatre (1973–1988), dementia.
Virgil Howe, 41, British drummer (Little Barrie).
Bruce Laming, 79, Australian politician, member of the Queensland Legislative Assembly for Mooloolah (1992–2001), dementia.
Mark LaMura, 68, American actor (All My Children, Something Borrowed, City by the Sea), lung cancer.
James Madison Lee, 90, American lieutenant general.
Alberto Pagani, 79, Italian Grand Prix motorcycle road racer (Honda, MV Agusta).
Jeff Parker, 53, American ice hockey player (Buffalo Sabres), heart and lung infections.
Arnold Sagalyn, 99, American journalist (Northern Virginia Sun).
António Francisco dos Santos, 69, Portuguese Roman Catholic prelate, Bishop of Aveiro (2006–2014) and Porto (since 2014), heart attack.
Malcolm Templeton, 93, New Zealand diplomat, Permanent Representative to the United Nations (1973–1978).

12
Frank Capp, 86, American jazz drummer.
John Chambers, 86, Australian cricketer.
Heiner Geißler, 87, German politician, Secretary General of the CDU (1977–1989), Federal Minister of Youth, Family and Health (1982–1985).
Alex Hawkins, 80, American football player (Baltimore Colts).
Charles F. Knight, 81, American businessman (Emerson Electric), complications from Alzheimer's disease.
Siegfried Köhler, 94, German conductor (Hessisches Staatstheater Wiesbaden, Royal Swedish Opera).
Allan MacEachen, 96, Canadian politician, Deputy Prime Minister (1977–1979, 1980–1984), MP for Inverness—Richmond (1953–1958, 1962–1968) and Cape Breton Highlands—Canso (1968–1984).
Bert McCann, 84, Scottish footballer (Motherwell, national team).
Nicoletta Panni, 84, Italian opera singer.
Tudor Petruș, 67, Romanian Olympic fencer.
Xohana Torres, 85, Spanish Galician language writer, poet, narrator and playwright.
Gary I. Wadler, 78, American physician, multiple system atrophy.
Edith Windsor, 88, American mathematician and activist, lead plaintiff in United States v. Windsor.

13
Basi, 37, Chinese panda, world's oldest living, cirrhosis and renal failure.
David Bey, 60, American boxer, struck by steel sheet.
Peter Birch, 65, British actor (Casualty, The House of Eliott), esophageal cancer.
Pete Domenici, 85, American politician, member of the U.S. Senate for New Mexico (1973–2009), complications from abdominal surgery.
Per Fugelli, 73, Norwegian author, physician and professor of medicine, colorectal cancer.
Basil Gogos, 88, American magazine cover illustrator (Famous Monsters of Filmland).
Slavko Goldstein, 89, Croatian journalist, screenwriter (Signal Over the City), publisher and politician.
Grant Hart, 56, American singer, songwriter ("Turn On the News") and drummer (Hüsker Dü), liver cancer.
Saby Kamalich, 78, Peruvian film and television actress (Simplemente María).
Stewart Moss, 79, American actor, writer, and director.
Gary Otte, 45, American murderer and robber, execution by lethal injection.
Edwin H. Ragsdale, 87, American politician. 
Kazimierz Ryczan, 78, Polish Roman Catholic prelate, Bishop of Kielce (1993–2014).
Robert Franz Schmidt, 84, German physiologist.
Frank Vincent, 80, American actor (The Sopranos, Goodfellas, Raging Bull), complications during heart surgery.
Derek Wilkinson, 82, English footballer (Sheffield Wednesday).

14
Wolfgang Bochow, 73, German badminton player.
Arnold Chan, 50, Canadian politician and lawyer, MP for Scarborough—Agincourt (since 2014), nasopharyngeal carcinoma.
George Englund, 91, American film producer and director (The Ugly American, Zachariah), fall.
Michael Freeman, 85, British orthopaedic surgeon.
Marcel Herriot, 83, French Roman Catholic prelate, Bishop of Verdun (1987–1999) and Soissons (1999–2008).
Ermalee Hickel, 92, American philanthropist, First Lady of Alaska (1966-1969, 1990-1994).
Wim Huis, 89, Dutch footballer (Ajax).
John Humphreys, 85, Australian Olympic fencer (1960, 1964). 
Tommy Irvin, 88, American politician, Georgia Commissioner of Agriculture (1969–2011), member of the Georgia House of Representatives.
Djibo Leyti Kâ, 69, Senegalese politician, Foreign Minister (1991–1993).
Ata Kandó, 103, Hungarian-born Dutch photographer.
Wolfgang Michels, 66, German musician (Percewood's Onagram).
Jan Niemiec, 76, Polish slalom canoeist (bronze medallist in 1961 World Championship).
Jack Teele, 87, American football executive.
Otto Wanz, 74, Austrian professional wrestler (AWA, NJPW) and promoter (CWA).

15
Arthur Apfel, 94, British figure skater.
Violet Brown, 117, Jamaican supercentenarian, world's oldest living person.
Alma Evans-Freke, 85, New Zealand television presenter.
Frode Granhus, 52, Norwegian author.
Mircea Ionescu-Quintus, 100, Ukrainian-born Romanian politician, Minister of Justice (1991–1992) and President of the Senate (2000), heart failure.
Herbert W. Kalmbach, 95, American attorney and banker, figure in the Watergate scandal.
Wolfgang Klein, 76, German lawyer, football director (Hamburger SV), and Olympic long-jumper (1964).
Izidoro Kosinski, 85, Brazilian Roman Catholic prelate, Bishop of Três Lagoas (1981–2009).
Myrna Lamb, 87, American playwright, heart disease.
Leon Mestel, 90, British astronomer and astrophysicist.
Albert Moses, 79, Sri Lankan actor.
*Nan Rendong, 72, Chinese astronomer, founder of the Five hundred meter Aperture Spherical Telescope, lung cancer.
Dwijen Sharma, 88, Bangladeshi naturalist, kidney disease.
Anthony Thomas Smith, 82, British lawyer.
Albert Speer, 83, German architect (Expo 2000), complications from a fall.
Harry Dean Stanton, 91, American actor (Alien, The Green Mile, Big Love).
Hans Weinberger, 88, Austrian-born American mathematician.
Geoff Wragg, 87, British horse trainer (Teenoso, Pentire).

16
Bautista Álvarez, 84, Spanish Galician nationalist politician, heart attack.
Gerald Bernbaum, 81, British academic administrator, Vice-Chancellor of Southbank University (1993–2001), cancer.
Penny Chenery, 95, American racehorse owner and breeder (Secretariat).
Ted Christopher, 59, American racecar driver (NASCAR Whelen Modified Tour), plane crash.
Ben Dorcy, 92, American roadie.
Steve Evans, 59, English rugby league player (Hull FC, Featherstone Rovers).
Mitchell Flint, 94, American fighter pilot (Navy, 101 Squadron).
José Florencio Guzmán, 88, Chilean lawyer and politician, Minister of National Defence (1998–1999).
Nicolaas Jouwe, 93, Papuan politician, vice-president of New Guinea Council (1961–1962).
Brenda Lewis, 96, American opera soprano and theatre actress.
Madge Meredith, 96, American actress (Child of Divorce, The Falcon's Adventure).
Fred Moore, 97, French colonel and politician, MP (1958–1962) and Order of Liberation (2011).
Nabeel Qureshi, 34, American Christian apologist, stomach cancer.
Brendan Reilly, 38, Irish Gaelic football player (Louth GAA).
Marcelo Rezende, 65, Brazilian journalist and television presenter (Linha Direta), pancreatic and liver cancer.
Petr Šabach, 66, Czech writer (Babičky).
Bucky Scribner, 57, American football player (Green Bay Packers, Minnesota Vikings), brain cancer.
Arjan Singh, 98, Indian Air Force marshal, Lieutenant Governor of Delhi (1989–1990), heart attack.
Sven Oluf Sørensen, 96, Norwegian physicist.
Elżbieta Wierniuk, 66, Polish Olympic diver.

17
Bonnie Angelo, 93, American journalist (Time), complications from dementia.
Steve Baker, 79, American illusionist. 
Eugenio Bersellini, 81, Italian football player and manager (Inter Milan, Sampdoria), pneumonia.
Cris Bolado, 47, Filipino basketball player (Alaska Milkmen), traffic collision.
Gerd Bollmann, 69, German politician.
Mahant Chandnath, 61, Indian politician, MP for Alwar (since 2014), cancer.
Kirpal Singh Chugh, 84, Indian nephrologist.
René Drucker Colín, 80, Mexican scientist, researcher and journalist.
Mary Fairfax, 95, Polish-born Australian philanthropist.
Suzan Farmer, 75, British actress (The Scarlet Blade, Doctor in Clover, Coronation Street).
Bill Goodling, 89, American politician, member of the U.S. House of Representatives from Pennsylvania's 19th congressional district (1975–2001).
Bobby Heenan, 72, American professional wrestler, manager and commentator (WWF, AWA, WCW), organ failure.
Dave Hilton, 67, American baseball player (San Diego Padres, Tokyo Yakult Swallows).
Bob Holland, 70, Australian cricketer (New South Wales, national team), brain cancer.
Per Kleiva, 84, Norwegian painter.
Marc Klionsky, 90, Belarusian-born American painter.
Laudir de Oliveira, 77, Brazilian percussionist (Sérgio Mendes, Marcos Valle, Chicago) and producer.
Lucy Ozarin, 103, American psychiatrist.
Buster Parnell, 83, Irish jockey.
Iftikhar Qaisar, 60, Pakistani actor.
Uwe Storch, 77, German mathematician.
Mohammed Taslimuddin, 74, Indian politician, MP for Araria (since 2014).
Lionel Wilson, 84, South African rugby union player (Western Province, national team).

18
Ronald E. Carrier, 85, American educator, President of James Madison University (1971–1998).
Roger Cisneros, 93, American politician, member of the Colorado Senate (1965–1977), carbon monoxide poisoning.
Paul E. Gray, 85, American professor, President of MIT (1980–1990), Alzheimer's disease.
Paul Horner, 38, American fake news writer and comedian, drug overdose.
Qamar ul Islam, 69, Indian politician, Member of Karnataka Parliament (1978–1983, 1989–1996, 1999–2004, since 2008), heart attack.
Tony Laffey, 92, New Zealand footballer.
Chuck Low, 89, American actor (Goodfellas, The Mission, Sleepers).
Jean Plaskie, 76, Belgian footballer (Anderlecht, national team).
Afzal Ahsan Randhawa, 80, Pakistani writer.
Mark Selby, 56, American musician, cancer.
Zurab Sotkilava, 80, Georgian-Russian footballer (Dinamo Tbilisi) and opera singer, People's Artist of the USSR, pancreatic cancer.
Sydney Starkie, 91, English cricketer.
Pete Turner, 83, American photographer.
Kenji Watanabe, 48, Japanese Olympic swimmer (1984, 1988, 1992).
Paul Wilson, 66, Scottish footballer (Celtic, national team).

19
Sir Brian Barder, 83, British diplomat, High Commissioner to Nigeria (1988–1991) and Australia (1991–1994).
Christine Butler, 73, British politician, MP for Castle Point (1997–2001), dementia.
Bernie Casey, 78, American actor (Revenge of the Nerds, Bill & Ted's Excellent Adventure) and football player (San Francisco 49ers).
Else Marie Christiansen, 96, Norwegian speed skater.
Sir John Hunt, 88, British politician, MP for Bromley (1964–1974) and Ravensbourne (1974–1997).
Leonid Kharitonov, 84, Russian opera singer, soloist of the Alexandrov Ensemble (1953–1972) and People’s Artist of the RSFSR (1986).
Jake LaMotta, 95, American Hall of Fame boxer and comedian, inspiration for Raging Bull, complications from pneumonia.
Maurice Lavigne, 86, French cyclist.
Vasily Melnikov, 74, Soviet Olympic skier.
Massimo Natili, 82, Italian racing driver (Formula One).
John Nicholson, 75, New Zealand racing driver (Formula Atlantic).
Sigurður Pálsson, 69, Icelandic author, cancer.
José Salcedo, 68, Spanish film editor (Women on the Verge of a Nervous Breakdown, Nobody Will Speak of Us When We're Dead, All About My Mother), Goya winner (1989, 1996, 2000).
Johnny Sandlin, 72, American record producer (The Allman Brothers Band), cancer.
David Shepherd, 86, British artist and conservationist, Parkinson's disease.
Manuela Sykes, 92, British politician and activist.
Helen J. Walker, 64, British space scientist.

20
Greg Antonacci, 70, American television producer (The Royal Family) and actor (The Sopranos, Boardwalk Empire). 
Santanu Bhowmik, 28, Indian journalist, murdered.
Ken Dean, 90, English rugby league footballer (Halifax).
William J. Ely, 105, American army officer.
Richard Gendall, 93, British linguist and teacher.
GK, 60, Indian art director (Avvai Shanmughi, Arunachalam, Chandramukhi)
Mickey Harrington, 82, American baseball player (Philadelphia Phillies).
Garry Hill, 70, American baseball player (Atlanta Braves).
Jimmy Magee, 82, Irish sports broadcaster (RTÉ).
Ene Mihkelson, 72, Estonian poet and novelist (Ahasveeruse uni).
Ed Phillips, 73, American baseball player (Boston Red Sox), cancer.
Lillian Ross, 99, American journalist (The New Yorker) and author, stroke.
Oskar Schulz, 93, Austrian Olympic cross country skier (1952, 1956), mineralogist and petrologist.
Shakila, 82, Indian actress (Aar Paar, C.I.D., Alibaba Aur 40 Chor), heart attack.
Arne Solli, 79, Norwegian military officer, Chief of Defence (1994–1999).
Sir Teddy Taylor, 80, British politician, MP for Glasgow Cathcart (1964–1979) and Rochford and Southend East (1980–2005).

21
Edward Allington, 66, British sculptor.
David Beatson, 72–73, New Zealand broadcaster.
Liliane Bettencourt, 94, French cosmetics businesswoman (L'Oréal) and socialite, world's richest woman (since 2015).
Johnny Burke, 77, Canadian country singer.
Vera Burt, 90, New Zealand cricketer (national team) and field hockey player (national team), coach and administrator.
*Juan Nicolás Callejas Arroyo, 73, Mexican politician, Deputy for Veracruz (1982–1985, 2000–2003, 2009–2012).
Michael Colborne, 83, British Royal Navy officer and private secretary. 
Warren Druetzler, 88, American Olympic athlete (1952).
Larry J. McKinney, 73, American federal judge, U.S. District Court for the Southern District of Indiana (1987–2009).
Maurice Nivat, 79, French computer scientist, co-father of theoretical computer science.
Evelyn Scott, 81, Australian Indigenous social activist, Chairwoman of the National Council for Aboriginal Reconciliation.
William G. Stewart, 84, British game show host (Fifteen to One) and television producer.

22
Mohammed Mahdi Akef, 89, Egyptian religious and political leader, head of the Muslim Brotherhood (2004–2010), cancer.
Mike Bright, 79, American Olympic volleyball player (1964).
Mike Carr, 79, English keyboard player.
Thelma Chalifoux, 88, Canadian Métis teacher and politician, Senator (1997–2004).
Dunc Fisher, 90, Canadian ice hockey player (New York Rangers, Hershey Bears, Boston Bruins).
Gérard Haché, 92, Canadian politician, New Brunswick MLA (1967–1970).
Vagn Hedeager, 78, footballer 
Paavo Lonkila, 94, Finnish cross-country skier, Olympic champion (1952).
Bill Michie, 81, British politician, MP for Sheffield Heeley (1983–2001), chest infection.
Shmuel Moreh, 84, Iraqi-born Israeli writer and Arabic professor (Hebrew University of Jerusalem).
Harold Pendleton, 93, British music executive and club owner (Marquee Club).
Rick Shaw, 78, American radio disc jockey (WQAM, WAXY, WMXJ).
Elizete da Silva, 46, Brazilian heptathlete, South American champion (2001, 2005, 2006), traffic collision.
Börje Vestlund, 57, Swedish politician, MP (since 2002).
Sima Wali, 66, Afghan human rights advocate.
John Worsdale, 68, English footballer (Stoke City, Lincoln City).
Daniel Yankelovich, 92, American social scientist, kidney failure.
Stan Zajdel, 90, American football player and coach.

23
Valery Asapov, 51, Russian army general, blast injury.
Charles Bradley, 68, American singer ("Changes"), stomach cancer.
Loreto Carbonell, 84, Filipino Olympic basketball player (1956), cardiac arrest.
Dorothy Eck, 93, American politician, member of the Montana Senate (1980–2000).
Seth Firkins, 36, American audio engineer (Future, Jay-Z, Young Thug).
Caesar Giovannini, 92, American composer and pianist.
Harvey Jacobs, 87, American author. 
Simon J. Kistemaker, 87, American theologian.
Aline Nistad, 63, Norwegian trombonist, cancer.
Charles Osborne, 89, Australian-born British music writer.
Elizabeth D. Phillips, 72, American educator and academic administrator, Provost of the University of Florida (1996–1999).
Samuel H. Young, 94, American politician, member of the U.S. House of Representatives from Illinois's 10th congressional district (1973–1975).

24
María Julia Alsogaray, 74, Argentine politician, MP for City of Buenos Aires (1985–1991) and Secretary of Natural Resources and Sustainable Development (1991–1999), pancreatic cancer.
Washington Benavides, 87, Uruguayan poet, professor and musician.
Barbara Blaine, 61, American founder of SNAP, heart disease.
Tharald Brøvig Jr., 75, Norwegian shipowner.
Gisèle Casadesus, 103, French actress (My Afternoons with Margueritte).
Al Cannava, 93, American football player (Green Bay Packers).
E.G.D. Cohen, 94, Dutch-American physicist.
Fiorenzo Crippa, 91, Italian cyclist.
Norman Dyhrenfurth, 99, Swiss-American mountaineer and filmmaker.
Jack Good, 86, British producer.
Albert Innaurato, 70, American playwright.
Kito Lorenc, 79, German writer, stroke.
Orville Lynn Majors, 56, American serial killer, heart failure.
Manuel da Silva Martins, 90, Portuguese Roman Catholic prelate, Bishop of Setúbal (1975–1998).
Joseph M. McDade, 85, American politician, member of the U.S. House of Representatives for Pennsylvania's 10th congressional district (1963–1999).
Robert J. McFarlin, 87, American politician, member of the Minnesota House of Representatives (1967–1970; 1973–1974).
Kit Reed, 85, American science fiction and mystery writer, brain tumor.
Carlos Vidal Layseca, 85, Peruvian doctor, Minister of Health (1990–1991) and Rector of Cayetano Heredia University (1994–1999).

25
Joe Bailon, 94, American car customizer, creator of candy apple red color.
M. Cherif Bassiouni, 79, Egyptian lawyer and human rights activist, multiple myeloma.
Richard Beckler, 77, American attorney. 
Tony Booth, 85, British actor (Till Death Us Do Part, Coronation Street, The Contender).
Nora Marks Dauenhauer, 90, American Tlingit author, poet, and scholar.
Liz Dawn, 77, British actress (Coronation Street, Crown Court, The Wheeltappers and Shunters Social Club), emphysema.
*Eman Ahmed Abd El Aty, 37, Egyptian woman, world's heaviest, kidney failure and intestinal shock.
Helga Grebing, 87, German historian.
Anatoly Gromyko, 85, Russian scientist and diplomat.
Mathew Hu Xiande, 83, Chinese clandestine Roman Catholic prelate, Coadjutor Bishop (2000–2004) and Bishop of Ningbo (since 2004).
Aneurin Jones, 87, Welsh painter.
Bobby Knutt, 71, British actor and comedian (Coronation Street, Benidorm, Emmerdale), heart attack.
Peter Lewis, 75, Australian politician, Speaker of the South Australian House of Assembly (2002–2005).
David Mainse, 81, Canadian televangelist.
Leonard Mashako Mamba, 66, Congolese politician, Minister of Public Health (1997–2001) and Minister of Higher Education and Universities (2008–2012).
Tom Miller, 70, Canadian ice hockey player (New York Islanders), cancer.
Grant H. Palmer, 77, American educator and writer (An Insider's View of Mormon Origins), cancer.
Clarence Purfeerst, 90, American politician, member of the Minnesota Senate (1971–1991).
Tim Quill, 54, American actor (Hamburger Hill, Argo, JAG), cancer.
Folke Rabe, 81, Swedish composer.
Charles Roff, 65, Scottish photographer.
Arun Sadhu, 76, Indian writer (Sinhasan), cardiomyopathy.
Joe Schaffer, 79, American football player (Buffalo Bills), progressive aphasia.
Freddy Shepherd, 76, English businessman, Chairman of Newcastle United (1997–2007).
Joseph W. Schmitt, 101, American spacesuit technician.
Yoshitomo Tokugawa, 67, Japanese writer, head of the Tokugawa Yoshinobu-ke (since 1993).
Jan Tříska, 80, Czech actor (Andersonville, 2010, The People vs. Larry Flynt), fall.
Jim Walrod, 56, American interior design consultant.
Elaine Hoffman Watts, 85, American drummer.

26
Mehmet Aksoy, 32, British filmmaker, shot.
Anthony Allom, 78, English cricketer (Surrey).
Samuel Amirtham, 85, Indian Anglican prelate and theologian, Bishop of South Kerala (1990–1997). 
Dominador Aytona, 99, Filipino politician, Senator (1965–1971).
Mario Bedogni, 93, Italian Olympic ice hockey player (1948, 1956).
Ludmila Belousova, 81, Russian pair skater, Olympic champion (1964, 1968).
Richard Boucher, 85, French footballer (Toulouse).
Donnie Corker, 65, American transvestite entertainer.
Sir James Craig, 93, British diplomat, Ambassador to Syria (1976–1979) and Saudi Arabia (1979–1984).
Robert Delpire, 91, French photographer, publisher and filmmaker.
Barry Dennen, 79, American actor (Jesus Christ Superstar, The Shining, The Dark Crystal), complications from a fall.
Květa Fialová, 88, Czech actress (Lemonade Joe, Dinner for Adele, The Phantom of Morrisville).
Neville Furlong, 49, Irish rugby player (national team), cancer.
Günter Halm, 95, German World War II military officer.
Augustine Hoey, 101, English priest.
Morton Kaplan, 96, American political scientist.
Fred Ryecraft, 78, English footballer (Brentford F.C.).
Sigmund Vangsnes, 91, Norwegian educationalist.
Rinse Zijlstra, 90, Dutch politician, MP (1967–1973), Mayor of Smallingerland (1975-1981), and Senator (1983–1995).

27
Edmond Abelé, 92, French Roman Catholic prelate, Bishop of Monaco (1972–1980) and Digne (1980–1987).
K.R. Aravindakshan, 66, Indian politician.
Dwijen Bandyopadhyay, 68, Indian actor (Jaatishwar), heart attack.
Raymond Buckland, 83, English Wiccan writer.
CeDell Davis, 90, American blues musician.
Joy Fleming, 72, German singer (Eurovision Song Contest 1975).
Hans Gerschwiler, 96, Swiss figure skater, Olympic silver medalist (1948).
Sir Richard Greenbury, 81, British businessman, Chairman of Marks and Spencer (1988–1999).
Hiromi Hayakawa, 34, Japanese-born Mexican actress (El Chema) and singer (La Academia), liver hemorrhage during childbirth.
Hugh Hefner, 91, American magazine publisher (Playboy), businessman (Playboy Enterprises) and reality television personality (The Girls Next Door), cardiac arrest due to sepsis.
Anne Jeffreys, 94, American actress (General Hospital, Topper, Dick Tracy).
Manuel Jiménez, 77, Spanish Olympic archer.
Vann Johnson, 56, American singer, cancer.
Red Miller, 89, American football coach (Denver Broncos), complications from a stroke.
Stanley M. Rumbough Jr., 97, American businessman (Colgate-Palmolive).
Zuzana Růžičková, 90, Czech harpsichordist, cancer.
Antonio Spallino, 92, Italian fencer and politician, Olympic champion (1956) and Mayor of Como (1970–1985).
Alfred Stepan, 81, American political scientist.

28
Aleksey Arifullin, 46, Russian footballer (Lokomotiv Moscow).
Jerry Balmuth, 93, American philosopher.
Chyung Jinkyu, 77, South Korean writer.
Makhan Lal Fotedar, 85, Indian politician.
Balys Gajauskas, 91, Lithuanian politician and prisoner of conscience, member of the Seimas (1990–1992).
Antonio Isasi-Isasmendi, 90, Spanish film director and producer (That Man in Istanbul, The Summertime Killer, They Came to Rob Las Vegas).
 Lee Hsin, 64, Taiwanese politician, member of the National Assembly (1996–1998) and the Taipei City Council (since 1998), suicide by jumping.
Marietta Marich, 87, American radio personality and actress (Rushmore, The Texas Chainsaw Massacre).
Donald Mitchell, 92, British musicologist.
Steven Marshall, 60, British chief executive (Railtrack).
Vann Molyvann, 90, Cambodian architect (Chaktomuk Conference Hall, Independence Monument, Phnom Penh Olympic Stadium).
Daniel Pe'er, 74, Israeli television host, complications from a stroke.
Željko Perušić, 81, Croatian football player and manager.
Jürgen Roth, 71, German journalist.
Andreas Schmidt, 53, German actor (Summer in Berlin, The Counterfeiters) and director, cancer.
Spikeld, 23–24, Norwegian racehorse, euthanized.
Alan Thompson, 54, British broadcaster (BBC Radio Wales).
Benjamin Whitrow, 80, British actor (Pride and Prejudice, Chicken Run, Quadrophenia), brain hemorrhage

29
Abu Tahsin al-Salhi, 63, Iraqi sniper, shot.
Tom Alter, 67, Indian actor, skin cancer.
Joep Baartmans-van den Boogaart, 77, Dutch politician. 
Keith Bush, 87, British army officer and intelligence analyst.  
Lorenz Funk, 70, German ice hockey player and manager (EC Bad Tölz, BSC Preussen), Olympic bronze medalist (1976), cancer.
Tim Hackworth, 84, British army officer.
Rolf Herings, 77, German Olympic javelin thrower (1964, 1968) and football coach (1. FC Köln).
Tore Lindbekk, 84, Norwegian sociologist and politician.
Philippe Médard, 58, French handball player, Olympic bronze medalist (1992).
Wiesław Michnikowski, 95, Polish actor.
Anthony Leopold Raymond Peiris, 85, Sri Lankan Roman Catholic prelate, Bishop of Kurunegala (1987–2009).
Magdalena Ribbing, 77, Swedish etiquette expert, writer and journalist, complications from a fall.
Ryūji Saikachi, 89, Japanese voice actor (Castle in the Sky, Dragon Ball Z, Anne of Green Gables), heart failure.
Jarvis Scott, 70, American Olympic sprinter (1968).
Ian Smith, 76, New Zealand rugby union player (Otago, national team).
Dmitry Smolsky, 80, Belarusian composer and teacher (Belarusian State Conservatory).

30
Alan K. Adlington, 92, Canadian economist.
Hortense Aka-Anghui, 83, Ivorian politician and pharmacist, MP (1965–1990), Mayoress of Port-Bouët (since 1980) and Minister of Women's Affairs (1986–1990).
Apex, 36, British drum and bass music producer, suicide.
John Arenhold, 86, South African cricketer.
Elizabeth Baur, 69, American actress (Ironside, Lancer, The Boston Strangler).
Francis Harold Brown, 73, American geologist.
Alan Carroll, 84, British RAF officer and engineer.
Max Haines, 86, Canadian crime columnist and author, progressive supranuclear palsy. 
Monty Hall, 96, Canadian-American game show host (Let's Make a Deal), heart failure.
Frank Hamblen, 70, American basketball coach (Milwaukee Bucks, Los Angeles Lakers), heart attack.
Donald Malarkey, 96, American soldier (Easy Company), depicted in Band of Brothers.
Jimmy McDonnell, 90, Irish Gaelic footballer.
Glen Newey, 56, British political philosopher, boating accident.
Tom Paley, 89, American folk musician (New Lost City Ramblers).
Lou Reda, 92, American documentary filmmaker.
Stig Stenholm, 78, Finnish physicist.
Joe Taruc, 70, Filipino news anchor and radio broadcaster (DZRH).
Gunnar Thoresen, 97, Norwegian footballer (Larvik Turn, national team).
Joe Tiller, 74, American football coach (University of Wyoming, Purdue University).
Vladimir Voevodsky, 51, Russian-American mathematician, 2002 Fields medalist, aneurysm.

References 

2017-09
 09